Dayanta station is an interchange station on Line 3 and Line 4 of the Xi'an Metro. It began operations on 8 November 2016. This station also serves for Line 4.

"Dayanta" means "Giant Wild Goose Pagoda", as this station is located on the north side of the northern square of the pagoda.

References

Railway stations in Shaanxi
Railway stations in China opened in 2016
Xi'an Metro stations